This article lists the graminoid species of Soldiers Delight Natural Environmental Area located in western Baltimore County, Maryland, United States. Graminoids, within the order of Poales, include: grasses (Poaceae), sedges (Cyperaceae), rushes (Juncaceae), and cattails (Typhaceae).

Introduction
Much of the area of the Soldiers Delight NEA, which totals  of protected land, contains a serpentine barren that contains a number of rare and endangered species of plants.

The Graminoids list was developed using the following publications, with authors' acronyms indicated:[F] Fleming et al. 1995, [M] Monteferrante 1973, [R] Reed 1984, [We] Wennerstrom 1995, and the unpublished data by [Wo] Worthley 1955-1985.

List of Graminoids of the Soldiers Delight Natural Environmental Area

Division Magnoliophyta; Class Liliopsida—Monocotyledons; Order Poales.

Families

Cyperaceae (Sedge Family)

Bulbostylis capillaris (L.) C.B. Clarke - Thread-leaf Beak-sedge[Wo]
Carex bicknellii Britt. - Bicknell's Sedge [Wo]
Carex bullata Schkuhr - Button Sedge [M, R]
Carex caroliniana Schwein. - Carolina Sedge [Wo]
Carex cephalophora Muhl. - Oval-headed Sedge [Wo]
Carex complanata Torr. & Hook. - Hirsute Sedge [M, R, Wo]
Carex convoluta Mackenzie? - [R]
Carex flaccosperma Dewey - Thin-fruited Sedge [R, Wo]
Carex hystericina Muhl. - Porcupine Sedge, Bottlebrush Sedge [R] {G5, S1, E}
Carex lupulina Muhl. - Hop Sedge [Wo]
Carex lurida Wahl. - Lurid Sedge, Sallow Sedge [Wo]
Carex nigromarginata Schwein. - Black-edge Sedge [Wo]
Carex pensylvanica Lam. - Pennsylvania Sedge [R, Wo]
Carex richardsonii R. Br. - Richardson's Sedge {G4, S1, E}
Carex rosea Schkuhr - Rosy Sedge, Stellate Sedge, Curly-Styled Wood Sedge [M, R]
Carex seorsa E.C. Howe - Weak Stellate Sedge [R]
Carex swanii (Fern.) Mackenzie - Swan's Sedge, Downy Green Sedge [Wo]
Carex umbellata Schk. - Parasol Sedge, Early Oak Sedge [R]
Cyperus esculentus L. - Yellow nutsedge [Wo]
Cyperus strigosus L.- Straw-colored Cyperus, Straw-colored Flat-sedge [M, R, Wo]
Eleocharis tenuis (Willd.) Schultes - Kill Cow, Slender Spikerush [M, R, Wo]
Eleocharis ovata (Roth) Roemer & Schultes - Blunt Spikerush, Ovate Spikerush [Wo]
Fimbristylis annua (All.) Roemer & Schultes - Annual Fimbry [M, R, We, Wo]
Fimbristylis autumnalis (L.) R. & S. - Autumn Sedge, Slender Fimbry [M, R]
Rhynchospora alba (L.) Vahl - White Beak-rush [M, R, Wo]
Scirpus atrovirens Willd. - Black Bulrush, Dark Green Bulrush [M, Wo]
Scirpus cyperinus (L.) Kunth - Woolgrass [Wo]
Scirpus hattorianus Makino - Early Dark-green Bulrush, Mosquito Bulrush [R]
Schoenoplectus validus (Vahl.) A. & D. Löve - Great Bulrush, Soft-stem Bulrush [M, R]
Scleria pauciflora Muhl. ex Willd. - Carolina Whipgrass, Few-flower Nutrush [M, R, Wo]

Juncaceae (Rush Family)

Juncus acuminatus Michx. - Tapertip Rush, Sharp-fruited Rush, Knotty Leaf Rush [Wo]
Juncus brevicaudatus (Engelm.) Fern. - Short-tailed Rush, Narrow-panicle Rush [M] {G5, S2}
Juncus bufonius L. - Toad Rush [M, Wo]
Juncus canadensis J. Gay - Canada Rush [M, Wo]
Juncus dichotomus Elliott (Syn. Juncus tenuis Willd. var. dichotomus (Elliott) A. Wood) - Forked Rush [Wo]
Juncus dudley Wiegand (Syn. Juncus tenuis Willd. var. dudleyi (Weig.) F.J. Herm.) - Dudley's Rush [R, Wo]
Juncus effusus L. - Common or Soft rush [Wo]
Juncus secundus Beauv. - Lopsided Rush, Nodding Rush [M, R, Wo]
Juncus subcaudatus (Engelm.) Conv. & Blake - Tailed Rush [M, R]
Juncus tenuis Willd. - Path Rush, Slender rush, Poverty Rush, Field Rush [M, R, We, Wo]
Luzula bulbosa (Wood.) Rydb. - Bulbous Woodrush [Wo]

Poaceae (Grass Family) 

Agrostis gigantea Roth - Redtop [R, Wo]
Agrostis hymenalis (Walter) BSP. - Tickle Grass [M, Wo]
Agrostis hymenalis (Walter) BSP. var. scabra (Willd.) Blomq. - Tickle Grass [R]
Agrostis perennans (Walt.) Tuckerman - Autumn or Upland Bent [M, R, Wo]
Andropogon gerardi Vitman - Big Bluestem [F, M, We, Wo]
Andropogon glomeratus (Walt.) B.S.P. var. glomeratus (Syn. Andropogon virginicus var. abbreviatus) - Bushy Bluestem [R]
Andropogon gyrans Ashe - Elliott's Bluestem [Wo]
Andropogon virginicus L.  - Broom-sedge [We, Wo]
Anthoxanthum odoratum L. - Sweet Vernal Grass [Wo]
Aristida dichotoma Michx. - Poverty Grass, Three-awn Grass [M, R, We, Wo]
Aristida oligantha Michx. - Prairie Three-awn [Wo]
Aristida purpurascens Poiret - Purple Three-awn [M, R, We, Wo]
Arrhenatherum elatius (L.) J & C.Presl. - Tall Oat Grass [Wo]
Brachyelytrum erectum (Schreb.) Beauv. - Bearded Shorthusk[Wo]
Bromus commutatus Schrader - Upright or Hairy Chess [M, Wo]
Bromus japonicus Thunb. - Japanese Bromegrass [R]
Bromus pubescens Muhl. - Canada Brome [Wo]
Bromus secalinus L. - Chess, Cheat [R]
Bromus tectorum L. - Drooping Brome, Downy Chess, Downy Brome [Wo]
Cinna arundinacea L. - Stout Woodreed [Wo]
Cynodon dactylon (L.) Pers. - Bermuda Grass [Wo]
Dactylis glomerata L. - Orchard Grass [M, We, Wo]
Danthonia sericea Nutt. - Downy Danthonia [Wo]
Danthonia spicata (L.) Beauv. - Poverty Grass [M, Wo]
Deschampsia cespitosa (L.) Beauv. - Tufted Hair-grass [We, Wo] {G5, S1, E}
Deschampsia flexuosa (L.) Trin. - Crinkled Hair-grass [R]
Dichanthelium aciculare (Desv. ex Poir.) Gould & C.A. Clark (Syn. Panicum aciculare) - Needle-leaf Rosette Grass [M]
Dichanthelium acuminatum (Sw.) Gould & C.A. Clark var. fasciculatum (Torr.) Freckmann (Syn. Panicum lanuginosum) - Western Panic Grass [M, Wo]
Dichanthelium boscii (Poir.) Gould & C.A. Clark (Syn. Panicum boscii) - Bosc's Panic Grass [Wo]
Dichanthelium clandestinum (L.) Gould (Syn. Panicum clandestinum) - Deer-tongue Grass [M, Wo]
Dichanthelium depauperatum (Muhl.) Gould (Syn. Panicum depauperatum) - Starved Panic Grass [M, Wo]
Dichanthelium dichotomum (L.) Gould (Syn. Panicum dichotomum) - Bushy Panic Grass [R, Wo]
Dichanthelium linearifolium (Scribn.) Gould (Syn. Panicum linearifolium) - Low Panic Grass [R, Wo]
Dichanthelium oligosanthes (Schultes) Gould (Syn. Panicum oligosanthes) - Few-flowered Panic Grass [R, Wo] {G5, S2}
Dichanthelium sphaerocarpon (Elliott) Gould (Syn. Panicum sphaerocarpon) - Round-fruited Panic Grass [R, Wo]
Digitaria filiformis (L.) Koeler - Finger Grass [R]
Digitaria ischaemum (Schreb.) Muhl. - Smooth Crabgrass [M, R, Wo]
Digitaria sanguinalis (L.) Scop. - Crabgrass [Wo]
Echinochloa crus-galli (L.) Beauv. - Barnyard Grass [M, Wo]
Eleusine indica (L.) Gaertn. - Goose-grass [Wo]
Elymus hystrix L. - Bottle-brush Grass [Wo]
Elymus virginicus L. - Virginia Wild-rye [M, Wo]
Elytrigia repens (L.) Nevski - Quackgrass, Witchgrass [Wo]
Eragrostis capillaris (L.) Nees - Lace Grass [Wo]
Eragrostis cilianensis (All.) Janchen - Stink-grass [Wo]
Eragrostis minor Host - Little Lovegrass [Wo]
Eragrostis spectabilis (Pursh) Steudel - Purple Lovegrass [Wo]
Festuca elatior L. - Meadow Fescue, Tall Fescue [M, Wo]
Festuca ovina L. - Sheep Fescue [Wo]
Festuca rubra L. - Red Fescue [R, Wo]
Festuca subverticillata (Pers.) E. Alexeev. - Nodding Fescue [Wo]
Glyceria striata (Lam.) Hitchc. - Fowl Manna Grass [Wo]
Hierochloe odorata (L.) Beauv. - Vanilla Grass, Holy Grass [M, R, We, Wo] {G4, S1, E}
Holcus lanatus L. - Velvet Grass [Wo]
Leersia virginica Willd. - White Grass [Wo]
Lolium perenne L.  - Perennial ryegrass [Wo]
Microstegium vimineum (Trin.) A. Camus - Japanese Stilt Grass [EU]
Miscanthus sinensis Andersson -  Chinese silver grass, Eulalia [Wo]
Muhlenbergia frondosa (Poiret) Fernald - Wirestem Muhly [M, Wo]
Muhlenbergia mexicana (L.) Trin. - Satin Grass, Wire-stem Muhly [R]
Muhlenbergia schreberi J.F. Gmelin - Nimblewill [Wo]
Muhlenbergia sobolifera (Muhl.) Trin. - Branched Muhly [R]
Panicum capillare L. - Old Witch Grass [M, Wo]
Panicum dichotomiflorum Michx. - Spreading Witch Grass [Wo]
Panicum philadelphicum Bernh. - Wood Witch Grass [Wo]
Panicum verrucosum Muhl. - Warty Panic Grass [R]
Panicum virgatum L. - Switchgrass
Paspalum laeve Michx. - Smooth Paspalum [Wo]
Phalaris arundinacea L. - Reed canary grass [Wo]
Phleum pratense L. - Timothy-grass [M, R, Wo]
Poa annua L. - Annual Meadow-grass, Spear grass [Wo]
Poa compressa L. - Canada Bluegrass [M, R, Wo]
Poa languida A. Hitch. - Weak Speargrass [M] {G3, SU}
Poa palustris L. - Fowl Meadow-grass [M] {G5, SH}
Poa pratensis L. - Kentucky Bluegrass, Smooth Meadow-grass [R, Wo]
Poa trivialis L. - Rough-stalked Bluegrass [M, Wo]
Schizachyrium scoparium Michx. Nash - Little Bluestem [F, M, We, Wo]
Setaria faberi Herrm. - Faber's Foxtail  [Wo]
Setaria geniculata (Lam.) Beauv. - Knotroot Bristle-grass [M, Wo]
Setaria glauca (L.) P. Beauv. - Yellow Foxtail [M, Wo]
Setaria viridis (L.) Beauv. - Green Foxtail [R, We, Wo]
Sorghastrum nutans Nash - Indian Grass [M, R, We, Wo]
Sorghum halepense (L.) Pers. - Johnson Grass [Wo]
Sphenopholis obtusata (Michx.) Scribn. - Prairie Wedge-grass [M, R, Wo]
Sphenopholis obtusata (Michx.) Scribn. var. major (Torr.) K.S. Erdman - [M, R, Wo]
Sphenopholis pensylvanica (L.) A. Hitchc. - Swamp-oats [Wo]  {G4, S1, T}
Sporobolus vaginiflorus (Torr.) Wood - Poverty Grass [R, Wo]
Tridens flavus (L.) A. Hitchc. - Purple-top [We, Wo]
Tripsacum dactyloides (L.) L. - Eastern Gamma-grass [We]
Vulpia octoflora (Walter) Rydb. - Six-weeks Fescue [Wo]

Typhaceae (Cattail Family) 
Typha latifolia L. - Broad-leaf Cat-tail [We]

See also
Soldiers Delight Natural Environmental Area
Ferns and fern allies of Soldiers Delight
Lichens of Soldiers Delight
Woody Plants of Soldiers Delight
Wildflowers of Soldiers Delight
Maryland + U.S.
Lichens of Maryland
Natural Environment Area (Maryland)
Grasses of the United States

References

Brown, Melvin L. and Russell G. Brown. 1984. Herbaceous Plants of Maryland. Port City Press, Inc., Baltimore, Maryland, 1127 pages.
Davis, Charles A. 2004. List of Plants of Soldier's Delight. (Unpublished). 
[F]   Fleming, Cristol, Marion B. Lobstein and Barbara Tufty. 1995.  Finding Wildflowers in the Washington-Baltimore Area. The Johns Hopskins University Press, Baltimore and London, 312 pages.
Gleason, Henry A., and Arthur Cronquist. 1991. Manual of Vascular Plants of Northeastern United States and Adjacent Canada. (Second Edition) The New York Botanical Garden, Bronx, New York 10458, 910 pages.
Google Hybrid Map. 2006. Target building, Soldiers Delight Visitor Center. 
Holmgren, Noel H. 1998. Illustrated Companion to Gleason and Cronquist's Manual. Illustrations of the Vascular Plants of Northeastern U. S. and Adjacent Canada. The New York Botanical Garden, Bronx, New York 10458, 937 pages.
Maryland Department of Natural Resources. 2003. Explanation of Rank and Status Codes. 
Maryland Department of Natural Resources. 2004. Current and Historical Rare, Threatened, and Endangered Species of Baltimore County, Maryland. 
[M]   Monteferrante, Frank. 1973. A Phytosociological Study of Soldiers Delight, Baltimore County, Maryland. Towson State College, Towson, Maryland.
[R]   Reed, Clyde F. 1984. Floras of the Serpentinite Formations in Eastern North America, with descriptions of geomorphology and mineralogy of the formations. Reed Herbarium, Baltimore, Maryland.
[We]   Wennerstrom, Jack. 1995. Soldiers Delight Journal - Exploring a Globally Rare Ecosystem. University of Pittsburgh Press, Pittsburg and London, 247 pages.
[Wo]   Worthley, Elmer G. 1955-1985. List of Plants of Soldier's Delight. Unpublished.

External links

Maryland Dept. Natural Resources — "Guide to the Soldiers Delight Natural Environmental Area"
Ongoing Survey List of Plants of Soldier's Delight

.Soldiers Delight
Soldiers Delight
Soldiers Delight
Soldiers Delight related
Soldiers Delight